Ascendancy is the second studio album by American heavy metal band Trivium. It was released on March 15, 2005, through Roadrunner Records and was produced by Jason Suecof and Matt Heafy.

Background
This marks the first Trivium album to feature guitarist Corey Beaulieu and bassist Paolo Gregoletto. The album was produced by Jason Suecof and frontman Matt Heafy. The album spawned four singles: "Like Light to the Flies", "Pull Harder on the Strings of Your Martyr", "A Gunshot to the Head of Trepidation" and "Dying in Your Arms". Music videos for each of the songs were shot; a promotional video was filmed for the song "Rain".

The music video for "Like Light to the Flies" debuted at MTV2's Headbangers Ball on September 25, 2004 and features the original demo of the song, which was included on the MTV compilation album Headbangers Ball Volume 2. Likewise, demos of songs "The Deceived" and "Blinding Tears Will Break the Skies" were included on the re-release of Trivium's debut album Ember to Inferno, nearly a year before Ascendancy was released.

Speaking to Kerrang! about the songs' lyrics, Matt Heafy said: "Definitely, some of the lyrics are about my personal insecurities and my social issues and disorders, and there's a thing about quietness in the music industry – people assume you're a dickhead if you don't want to talk, and that was definitely said about me. Being in a band forced me to have to get over my awkwardness around people and you can really see what I was going through in there." Heafy considers Ascendancy his favorite Trivium album.

Reception

Critical 

Upon its release, the album received critical acclaim. In a very positive review, Johnny Loftus of AllMusic said about the album, "Ascendancy aligns real-deal thrash with powerful modern influences. But at all times it's a platform for Trivium's own crazed talent."

Accolades 
In 2005, Ascendancy won the "Album of the Year Award" from Kerrang! magazine.
"Dying in Your Arms" was nominated for Best Single at the 2006 Kerrang! Awards.
In August 2009, Ascendancy ended up No. 22 in Kerrang!s "21st Century's Greats" list.
In October 2018, Ascendancy ended up No. 11 in Metal Hammers The 100 Greatest Metal Albums of the 21st Century list.

Commercial performance
Since its release, Ascendancy has sold over 500,000 copies worldwide. In the U.S., the album peaked at No. 151 on the Billboard 200 and at No. 4 on the Top Heatseekers charts, and has sold over 140,000 units. In the UK, it peaked at No. 79, and shipped over 100,000 copies, attaining Gold status, without entering the UK top 75.

Track listing

Bonus DVD

Notes 
 The bonus track "Washing Away Me in the Tides" was included on the Underworld: Evolution soundtrack.
 A demo of the song "Blinding Tears Will Break the Skies" was included on the Ember to Inferno re-release and later re-recorded and included as a bonus track on the re-release of Ascendancy.
 A demo of the song "The Deceived" was also included on the Ember to Inferno re-release and was later re-recorded and included as a track on Ascendancy.
 The entire Ascendancy album was originally recorded in Drop D♭ tuning. However, because of an error, everything ended up out of tune, so the band tuned up to Drop D.

Personnel

Trivium 
Matt Heafy – lead vocals, guitars, production, art concept
Corey Beaulieu – guitars, backing vocals
Paolo Gregoletto – bass, backing vocals
Travis Smith – drums, percussion, gang vocals on track 6

Production personnel
Jason Suecof – production, engineering, mixing on track 15, guitar solo on track 3
Andy Sneap – mixing, mastering, gang vocals on track 6
Jeff Weed – engineering assistance
Aaron Caillier – engineering assistance
Mark Lewis – co-engineer on track 15

Additional personnel
Chad Sunderland – gang vocals on track 6
Gizz Butt – gang vocals on track 6
Paul A. Romano – art direction, artwork, graphic design
Josh Rothstein – photography

Charts

References

2005 albums
Trivium (band) albums
Roadrunner Records albums
Albums produced by Jason Suecof